The Dayton State Bank, at 133 C St. in Dayton in Lake County, Montana, was listed on the National Register of Historic Places in 2012. It is the only example of Egyptian Revival architectural style of its era known to be surviving in the state.

References

National Register of Historic Places in Lake County, Montana
Buildings and structures completed in 1912
Bank buildings on the National Register of Historic Places in Montana
Egyptian Revival architecture in the United States
1912 establishments in Montana